Doris Preindl (born 9 August 1977) is an Italian luger. She competed in the women's singles event at the 1998 Winter Olympics.

References

External links
 

1977 births
Living people
Italian female lugers
Olympic lugers of Italy
Lugers at the 1998 Winter Olympics
Sportspeople from Bruneck